Sigurður Egill Lárusson (born 22 January 1992) is an Icelandic football midfielder, who currently plays for Valur. He is the brother of Dóra María Lárusdóttir.

International career
Sigurður has been involved with the U-17, U-19 and U-21 teams, and made his senior team debut against Chile at the 2017 China Cup.

References

External links

1992 births
Living people
Sigurdur Egill Lárusson
Association football midfielders
Sigurdur Egill Lárusson
Sigurdur Egill Lárusson
Sigurdur Egill
Sigurður Egill Lárusson